Two total lunar eclipses occurred in 1960: 

 13 March 1960 lunar eclipse
 5 September 1960 lunar eclipse

See also 
 List of 20th-century lunar eclipses
 Lists of lunar eclipses